Zou Liankang is a Chinese swimmer. He won the gold medal at the Men's 100 metre Backstroke S2 event at the 2016 Summer Paralympics with a world record and paralympic record of 1:45.25.

References

Living people
Swimmers at the 2016 Summer Paralympics
Swimmers at the 2020 Summer Paralympics
Medalists at the 2016 Summer Paralympics
Medalists at the 2020 Summer Paralympics
Paralympic gold medalists for China
Paralympic silver medalists for China
Paralympic swimmers of China
Chinese male freestyle swimmers
Chinese male backstroke swimmers
1995 births
Paralympic medalists in swimming
S2-classified Paralympic swimmers
21st-century Chinese people
Medalists at the 2018 Asian Para Games